The 2011–12 Pro League season (known as Etisalat Pro League for sponsorship reasons) was the 37th top-level football season in the UAE, and the fourth Professional season.

Al Jazira was the defending champions, having won their 1st Pro League title in the 2010–11 campaign after being runner-up for three times in a row. Al Dhafra and Ittihad Kalba were relegated from the previous season. Ajman and Emirates were promoted from the UAE Division 1 Group A. The campaign began on 15 October 2011 and finished on 27 May 2012.

Teams
Ittihad Kalba and Al Dhafra were relegated to the 2011–12 UAE Division 1 Group A after finishing in the bottom two spots of the table at the end of the 2010–11 season. The two relegated teams were replaced by 2nd level champions Ajman Club and runners up Emirates Club.

Stadia and locations

Personnel
Note: Flags indicate national team as has been defined under FIFA eligibility rules. Players and Managers may hold more than one non-FIFA nationality.

Managerial changes
Managerial changes during the 2011–12 campaign.

Pre-season

During the season

League table

Results

Goalscorers

22 goals
 Asamoah Gyan (Al Ain)

16 goals
 Grafite (Al-Ahli)
 André Senghor (Bani Yas)

14 goals
 Ricardo Oliveira (Al-Jazira)

13 goals
 Luis Jiménez (Al-Ahli)
 Juan Manuel Olivera (Al Wasl)

11 goals
 Ciel (Al Shabab)

10 goals
 Mark Bresciano (Al Nasr)
 Baré (Al-Jazira)
 Edinho (Al-Sharjah) 
 Marcelinho (Al-Sharjah) 
 Modibo Diarra (Emirates Club)

Source: official site:

See also
 List of United Arab Emirates football transfers summer 2011
 2011–12 UAE President's Cup
 2011–12 Etisalat Emirates Cup

References

External links
 Pro League Official Website
 Football Association The UAE Football Association

UAE Pro League seasons
United
1